Andranik Avetisyan (born 28 December 1968, in Gyumri) is an Armenian artist. 
He noticed a cobweb in the corner of the window in his studio. Then he had the idea to create a picture of a cobweb,  and began to study the life of  spiders, and the structure of their cobwebs. Afterwards, he began to breed  spiders in order to use their cobwebs to create pictures. Avetisyan's works are made of real cobweb  He is  the first artist who uses cobwebs for pictures (Cobweb art). Andranik Avetisyan was awarded the "New Talent and Creative Thought" prize at the Cannes International Exhibition of Modern Art, which was held in 2017.

Works

References

External links

Former Gyumri Mayor candidate shocks Cannes exhibition
 Website Avetisyan, Andranik
Սարդոստայնների «տիրակալը» նոր ոճ է ստեղծել 
Արվեստագետը նկարում է սարդոստայններով 
Պատկերասրահ՝ բնական սարդոստայնով ստեղծված նկարներով 
Interview by CIVILNET. YouTube – Նկարներ սարդոստայնից 

1968 births
Living people
People from Gyumri
Armenian artists